The 5th Annual TV Week Logie Awards were announced on Wednesday 26 March 1963 by TV Week. The award ceremony was to have taken place at the Chevron-Hilton Hotel in Sydney on 23 March 1963 and been broadcast on the Australian Broadcasting Corporation (ABC), with Tony Hancock and Marie McDonald as guest presenters, but Hancock cancelled his trip to Australia due to illness. The presentation ceremony was postponed until July on board cruise liner Changsha. This article lists the winners of Logie Awards (Australian television) for 1963:

Awards

Gold Logie
Most Popular Personality on Australian Television
Winner:
Michael Charlton

Logie

National
Best Actor
Winner:
Syd Conabere, The One Day of the Year

Best Overseas Series
Winner:
Ben Casey

Best Drama
Winner:
The One Day of the Year, Nine Network

Best Youth Entertainment
Winner:
Johnny O'Keefe

Best Male Singer
Winner:
Lionel Long

Best Female Singer
Winner:
Judy Stone

Best Commercial
Winner:
Craven A

Outstanding Achievement
Winner:
Joan Sutherland Spectacular

Outstanding Contribution to Children's Entertainment
Winner:
Happy Hammond

Enterprising Programming (country stations only)
Winner:
NBN3, Newcastle

Victoria
Most Popular Male 
Winner:
Graham Kennedy

Most Popular Female 
Winner:
Panda Lisner

Most Popular Program
Winner:
In Melbourne Tonight, GTV

New South Wales
Most Popular Male
Winner:
Chuck Faulkner

Most Popular Female
Winner:
Diana Ward

Most Popular Program
Winner:
Startime, ATN

South Australia
Most Popular Male 
Winner:
Lionel Williams

Most Popular Female
Winner:
Angela Stacey

Most Popular Program 
Winner:
Adelaide Tonight, NWS

Queensland
Most Popular Male 
Winner:
George Wallace Jnr

Most Popular Female
Winner:
Jackie Ellison

Most Popular Program
Winner:
Theatre Royal, BTQ

Western Australia
Most Popular Personality
Winner:
Gary Carvolth

Tasmania
Most Popular Personality
Winner:
Wendy Ellis

Special Achievement Award
Special Achievement Award for Comedy
Winner:
Dawn Lake and Bobby Limb

Special Achievement Award for Dancing
Winner:
Carlu Carter and Bill McGrath

Special Achievement Award for Variety
Winner:
Lorrae Desmond Show, ABC

Special Achievement Award
Winner:
Tommy Hanlon, Jr., It Could Be You

Special Achievement Award
Winner:
Bob Dyer, Jack Davey Special

References

External links

Australian Television: 1962-1965 Logie Awards 
TV Week Logie Awards: 1963

1963 television awards
1963 in Australian television
1963